Towchal (also Romanized as Towchāl) is a village in Hesar-e Amir Rural District, in the Central District of Pakdasht County, Tehran Province, Iran. At the 2006 census, its population was 1,551, in 423 families.

References 

Populated places in Pakdasht County